Diduga is a genus of moths in the family Erebidae.

Description
Palpi slender and obliquely porrect. Tibia with long spurs. Forewings with vein 3 arise from before angle of cell. Veins 4 and 5 from angle, vein 6 from upper angle and veins 7 and 8 are stalked. Hindwings with vein 4 from angle of cell, vein 5 from above angle, vein 3 absent and veins 6 and 7 are stalked. Forewings of male possess a costal fold acting like the retinaculum.

Species
 Diduga albicosta
 Diduga albida
 Diduga annulata
 Diduga barlowi
 Diduga ciliata
 Diduga dorsolobata
 Diduga excisa
 Diduga flavicostata
 Diduga fumipennis
 Diduga haematomiformis
 Diduga metaleuca
 Diduga pectinifer
 Diduga plumosa
 Diduga rufidiscalis
 Diduga trichophora

References

External links

Nudariina
Moth genera